Roland Ebert was a West German bobsledder who competed during the 1960s. He won a gold medal in the four-man event at the 1966 FIBT World Championships after his teammate Toni Pensperger was killed during the four-man event. Pensperger was posthumously awarded the gold medal while Ebert and his surviving teammates Ludwig Siebert and Helmut Werzer received their golds as well.

References

 Bobsleigh four-man world championship medalists since 1930

German male bobsledders
Possibly living people
Year of birth missing